Llancarfan is a rural village and community in the Vale of Glamorgan, Wales. The village, located west of Barry and near Cowbridge, has a well-known parish church, the site of Saint Cadoc's 6th-century clas, famed for its learning. Cainnech of Aghaboe, Caradoc of Llancarfan and many other Welsh holy men studied there. At the 2001 census, the community had a population of 736., in 2011 census it was 747. Most of the village lies within a conservation area designated by the local authority in 1971. Buildings listed as being of special historic interest include The Fox and Hounds public house, the former Bethlehem Chapel, the former Wesleyan Chapel, Chapel Cottage, Great House, Corner House and Llancarfan Primary School. The community includes village of Moulton.

The spacious church, which in the later Middle Ages belonged to Gloucester Abbey, contains a stoup and interesting remains of a rood screen, now adapted as a reredos. In early 2008, architects discovered medieval wall painting in the church under layers of whitewash, including one of only three depictions of St George to be found in churches in Wales. Conservation-restoration work to reveal the entire mural was completed in 2013.

The community forms half of the Rhoose electoral ward for elections to the Vale of Glamorgan Council.

References

External links

Llancarfan Society Web Page

Villages in the Vale of Glamorgan
Communities in the Vale of Glamorgan